Georgia State Route 20 is a state highway from the Alabama state line west of Coosa to Lower Woolsey Road southwest of Hampton

Georgia State Route 20 could also refer to:

 Georgia State Route 20 (1919-1921): a former state highway that existed from Gray to Sparta
 Georgia State Route 20 (1921–1929): a former state highway that existed from Louisville to Waynesboro

020 (disambiguation)